Crematogaster laeviuscula, known generally as the acrobat ant or valentine ant, is a species of ant in the family Formicidae.

References

Further reading

External links

 

laeviuscula
Articles created by Qbugbot
Insects described in 1870